Koźmiński is a Polish language surname of toponymic surname, derived from one of the Polish localities named Koźmin.

The surname may refer to:

Andrzej Koźmiński (born 1943), professor of management and founder of Kozminski University
Aaron Kosminski (born Aron Mordke Kozminski, 1865–1919), London Polish immigrant suspected of being Jack the Ripper
Marek Koźmiński (born 1971), Polish footballer
Leon Koźmiński (1904–1993), Polish economist
Lucian Kozminski (1916–1993), Polish-born American convicted of swindling Holocaust survivors

Polish-language surnames
Polish toponymic surnames